British Journal for the Philosophy of Science (BJPS) is a peer-reviewed, academic journal of philosophy, owned by the British Society for the Philosophy of Science (BSPS) and published by University of Chicago Press. The journal publishes work that uses philosophical methods in addressing issues raised in the natural and human sciences.

Overview
The leading international journal in the field, BJPS publishes outstanding new work on a variety of traditional and 'cutting edge' topics, from issues of explanation and realism to the applicability of mathematics, from the metaphysics of science to the nature of models and simulations, as well as foundational issues in the physical, life, and social sciences. Recent topics covered in the journal include the epistemology of measurement, mathematical non-causal explanations, signalling games, the nature of biochemical kinds, and approaches to human cognitive development, among many others. The journal seeks to advance the field by publishing innovative and thought-provoking papers, discussion notes and book reviews that open up new directions or shed new light on well-known issues.

The British Journal for the Philosophy of Science operates a triple-anonymized peer review process and receives over 600 submissions a year. It is fully compliant with the RCUK open access policy, and is a member of the Committee on Publication Ethics (COPE).

In 2016, book reviews were moved to online-only publication in the BJPS Review of Books.

The journal also runs a blog, Auxiliary Hypotheses.

Editorial board 

Past editors include J. O. Wisdom, Alexander Bird, Peter Clark, Mary Hesse, James Ladyman, Imre Lakatos, and David Papineau.

Editors-in-Chief 
Professor Robert D. Rupert (University of Colorado Boulder) and Professor Wendy Parker (Virginia Tech)

Deputy Editor 
Dr Elizabeth Hannon (LSE)

Associate Editors 
 Cameron Buckner (University of Houston)
 Pierrick Bouratt (Macquarie University)
 Shane N. Glackin (University of Exeter)
 Nick Huggett (University of Illinois, Chicago)
 Elizabeth Irvine (Cardiff University)
 Mary Leng (University of York)
 Peter J. Lewis (Dartmouth College)
 Alyssa Ney (University of California, Davis)
 Cédric Patternotte (Université Paris-Sorbonne)
 Anya Plutynski (Washington University in St. Louis)
 H. Orri Stefánsson (Stockholm University)
 Daniel Steel (University of British Columbia)
 Paul Weirich (University of Missouri-Columbia)

The BJPS Popper Prize 
The prize is awarded to the best paper appearing in The British Journal for the Philosophy of Science as determined by the Editors-in-Chief and the BSPS Committee. The prize includes a £500 award to the winner(s).

History of the prize 
The Sir Karl Popper Essay Prize was originally established at the wish of the late Dr Laurence B. Briskman, formerly of the Department of Philosophy, University of Edinburgh, who died on 8 May 2002, having endowed an essay prize fund to encourage work in any area falling under the general description of the critical rationalist philosophy of Karl Popper. Briskman was greatly influenced by Popper, who remained the dominant intellectual influence on his philosophical outlook throughout his career. While originally open for submissions, since 2011 the prize is only awarded to papers having appeared in The British Journal for the Philosophy of Science. The endowment ended in 2017, at which point the BSPS took over funding the prize. The decision was also taken to widen the prize's remit, to include all papers published in the BJPS and not just those concerned with Popper's work. At the same time, the prize's name was changed to the BJPS Popper Prize.

Previous winners

Impact factor 
The 2019 impact factor for BJPS was 2.605, while its five-year impact factor was 2.510, making it the leading philosophy of science journal, 3rd in the Science Citation Index, and 4th in the Social Sciences Citation Index.

References

External links 
 
 Print: 
 Online: 
 BJPS Review of Books
Auxiliary Hypotheses: The BJPS Blog
 British Society for the Philosophy of Science

Philosophy of science journals
Oxford University Press academic journals
Academic journals associated with learned and professional societies of the United Kingdom
Publications established in 1950
Quarterly journals
Philosophy Documentation Center academic journals